Recreational fishermen usually fish either from a boat or from a shoreline or river bank. When fishing from a boat, or fishing vessel, most fishing techniques can be used, from nets to fish traps, but some form of angling is by far the most common. Compared to fishing from the land, fishing from a boat allows more access to different fishing grounds and different species of fish.

Inshore
Inshore boat fishing is fishing from a boat in easy sight of land and in water less than about 30 metres deep. The boat can be as small as a dinghy. It can be a row boat, a runabout, an inflatable or a small cabin cruiser. Inshore boats are typically small enough to be carried on a trailer, and are much more affordable than offshore fishing boats. In recent times fishing from a kayak has become popular.

Anglers either use an uptide rod between 9 and 10 feet in length to cast from the boat or a shorter downtide rod between 6 and 8 feet.  Lines are usually between 18 pounds and 50 pounds breaking strain dependent on the species of fish being targeted. Reels are usually multipliers, although fixed spool reels are being used more and more.  Baits are similar to those used for beach and rock fishing except they are often larger since larger fish are targeted.  The species will include all the beach species, but now also include big conger eels and small sharks like tope and smoothhound.

Offshore

Offshore boat fishing, sometimes called deep sea or open water fishing, is fishing in deep water (more than 30 metres) and at some distance from land. It is dangerous compared to shallow water or lake fishing. More knowledge is needed about weather patterns, navigation and safety precautions, and this is not an activity for beginners.

Offshore boats are generally much larger than inshore boats, and may need to be moored in a marina. They are sturdily constructed so they can brave the weather and water conditions encountered in open waters. Though they differ in design and purpose and prices vary widely they are generally expensive to build and maintain. Most offshore recreational fishermen charter boats rather than own them. It is often a pastime of the affluent, and there is a demand for charter boats equipped and catered to luxurious excess.

Offshore game fish, like marlin and tuna, can be very large and heavy tackle is needed. Fishing is usually done with sea rods, such as  downtide rods, with lines of 30 to 50 pounds and multiplier reels. Baits are the same as for inshore fishing and include squid and whole mackerel as well as artificial lures such as perks. Fishing takes place over reefs and wrecks for very large cod, ling and congers.

See also
 Fishing vessel
 Traditional fishing boats

References
 Gibson, Barry (2001) Inshore Salt Water Fishing. Creative Publishing. 
 Newman, Bob (1994) Inshore Fishing: The Carolina Coast. Down Home Press. 

Fishing techniques and methods